The South of Ireland Open Tennis Championship originally called the South of Ireland Championships first established in 1876 or 1877 and also known as the Limerick Cup is a grass court tennis tournament that features both men's and women's competitions that is currently an official tour event of Tennis Ireland. It is held at the Limerick Lawn Tennis Club in Limerick, County Limerick, Ireland. The championships is the world's second oldest surviving tennis tournament after Wimbledon  but the only event to have been staged continuously for the last 141 years.

History
A South of Ireland Championships tournament was staged in 1876, and played at the Limerick County Cricket Club, in Limerick. Records appear contradictory, the staging of this initial tournament appears predate the founding of the Limerick LTC in 1877 by one year.

Limerick Lawn Tennis Club was first established in 1877 in Limerick, County Limerick, Ireland. The same year the club staged the first Open Championships in Ireland in August 1877 one month after the Wimbledon Championships were inaugurated, the results of that tournament were however not recorded. It was not until 1879 that the first Irish Lawn Tennis Championships were staged  at the Fitzwilliam Tennis Club in Dublin.
 
In 1878 the first South of Ireland Championships also known as the Limerick Cup were founded  the men's event was won by Veere St Leger Goold. The event featured both men's and women's singles and doubles competitions and was the first notable tournament in Great Britain and Ireland to feature a woman's competition seven years before the Wimbledon Championships followed suit. In 1881 the reigning Wimbledon Champion William Renshaw and his twin brother Ernest Renshaw entered the doubles competition. Between 1884 and 1885 no women's event were staged. The 1885 and 1886 editions were won by future Wimbledon Champion Willoughby Hamilton.

Between 1911 and 1912 the championships were won by Irishman Frank Cosbie. With the advent of World War One the championships were still held from 1914 and 1919. Post war the championships were won again by Irish Lawn Tennis Championships finalist Frank Cosbie three times consecutively 1924 to 1926.  The tournament was still staged during World War Two from 1939 to 1945. Post war the 1953 championships were won by American player Ellis Williamson.  In 1975 the men's championships were won Michael. P. Hickey who played in 21 Davis Cup competitions as part of the Irish Team. British player Ross Matheson won the event in 1991, 1994 and 1996. Into the 2000s Brian McCarthy was probably the most successful player he won the championships in (2010,2014) and reached the finals on four occasions (2010–11, 2013–16).

The tournament was part of the pre-open era men's tennis tour from 1878 to 1967. Into the Open Era it did not survive as a  tour tournament on the lucrative Grand Prix tennis circuit but did remain a fixture on the International Tennis Federation circuit for a short while until the mid-1990s. The tournament was downgraded again to regional status and continues to operate within the annual tennis tournament circuit of Tennis Ireland.  The championships were staged in June 2018 which was the 141st edition of this tournament it was won by James Halas.

Champions
Notes: Challenge Round: The Final round of a tournament, in which the winner of a single-elimination phase faces the previous year's champion, who plays only that one match. The challenge round was used in the early history of tennis (from 1877 through 1921)  in some tournaments not all.

Men's singles
Incomplete list of past winners and results included:

Venue
The Limerick Lawn Tennis Club currently operates 12 artificial (synthetic) grass turf outdoor tennis courts and 3 squash courts.

Notes

References

Sources
"Abolition of Challenge Rounds". paperspast.natlib.govt.nz. EVENING POST, VOLUME CIII, ISSUE 65, 20 MARCH 1922. 
"History - Limerick Lawn Tennis Club". www.lltc.ie. Limerick, Ireland: Limerick Lawn Tennis Club. 2013.
 Nieuwland, Alex (2017). "Tournament – South of Ireland Championships - Limerick Cup". www.tennisarchives.com. Harlingen, Netherlands: Idzznew BV. Retrieved.
 Tennis Ireland, (2011). "Senior South of Ireland 2011 - General". ti.tournamentsoftware.com. Tennis Ireland.
 Tennis Ireland, (2013) "Senior South of Ireland Open Tennis Championship 2013 - Organization". ti.tournamentsoftware.com. Tennis Ireland.
 Tennis Ireland, (2014). "Senior South of Ireland Open Tennis Championship 2014 - Organization". ti.tournamentsoftware.com. Tennis Ireland.  
 Tennis Ireland, (2015). "138th South Of Ireland Open Tennis Championships - Organization". ti.tournamentsoftware.com. Tennis Ireland. 
 Tennis Ireland, (2018). - "Hartmann Optometrists 141st South of Ireland Tennis Championships 2018"- "Organization". ti.tournamentsoftware.com. Official lawn Tennis Governing Body of Ireland.
 SOI Winners 1878 to 2016. Limerick LTC.
 "South of Ireland Championships". (1883). The Freeman's Journal. Dublin, Ireland: newspapers.com.
 https://ti.tournamentsoftware.com/Tennis Ireland:Clubs:Tournaments of Limerick Lawn Tennis

Further reading
 Ayre's Lawn Tennis Almanack And Tournament Guide, 1908 to 1938, A. Wallis Myers. 
 British Lawn Tennis and Squash Magazine, 1948 to 1967, British Lawn Tennis Ltd, UK.
 Dunlop Lawn Tennis Almanack And Tournament Guide, G.P. Hughes, 1939 to 1958, Dunlop Sports Co. Ltd, UK
 Lawn tennis and Badminton Magazine, 1906 to 1973,  UK.
 Lowe's Lawn Tennis Annuals and Compendia, Lowe, Sir F. Gordon, Eyre & Spottiswoode
 Spalding's Lawn Tennis Annuals from 1885 to 1922, American Sports Pub. Co, USA.
 The World of Tennis Annuals, Barrett John, 1970 to 2001.

External links
http://www.lltc.ie/official site limerick lawn tennis club

1877 establishments in Ireland
Grass court tennis tournaments
Recurring sporting events established in 1878
Sport in County Limerick
Tennis tournaments in Ireland